Malo (English: "Bad") is an American musical group known for its blend of Latino, rock, jazz and blues. The San Francisco-based ensemble was led by Richard Bean, Arcelio Garcia, and Jorge Santana, the brother of Latin-rock guitarist Carlos Santana.

Three of Malo's original members (Garcia, Pablo Tellez, and Santana) had previously played in the band The Malibus. The other three members (Abel Zarate, Roy Murray, and Richard Spremich) had played together in the group Naked Lunch. (Zarate also played in a band called the Righteous Ones together.)

History 
The band featured full horn and percussion sections in the style of contemporary bands Blood, Sweat & Tears and Chicago. Some of the best musicians in the Bay Area were featured in Malo, including Luis Gasca, Forrest Buchtel, Jr., Ron Smith, and Tom Poole in the trumpet section. Malo's music was popular in Central and South America, especially the songs "Chevere", "Nena", "Pana", "Cafe", and "Oye Mama".

After the release of their first album, many of Malo's original band members left the group in a rift widely publicized in the media. Buchtel went on to play with Blood, Sweat & Tears, Jaco Pastorius and Woody Herman; Harrell became one of the most lyrical trumpet soloists, working often with saxophonist Phil Woods; Abel Zarate went on to play with Willie Bobo and continues to play Latin/Brazilian Global jazz in San Francisco with his group Zarate Pollace Project. Richard Bean formed the group Sapo. Arcelio Garcia remained the leader of Malo until his passing in 2020.

Malo's January 1972 hit single, "Suavecito" (meaning "soft" or "smooth" in Spanish), was the group's only song that charted on Billboard's Top 20, at #18 for 10 weeks. Lyrics were written and sung by guest musician, Richard Bean.  

A vocal section of "Suavecito" was included in the refrain of Sugar Ray's 1999 hit song, "Every Morning", which was one of Sugar Ray's most successful singles, climbing to number one on the US Billboard Modern Rock Tracks chart and the Canadian RPM Top Singles chart, becoming the latter country's second-highest-selling single of 1999. The chorus of the song references "Suavecito".  Mark McGrath, Sugar Ray's frontman, says, "We referenced 'Suavecito' because growing up in California, you know, that was just like the low rider anthem. Any car show or swap meet you'd ever go by, you'd always hear that [song] and that just stuck in your mind." He added, "We actually came up with that part, and it was very similar to Malo's part. We were sort of imitating it, and then we said, 'Let's just leave it, we're gonna change it later.' It really makes the song – we think – so we just left it."

From 1994 to 1996, Malo was joined by new lead singer Martin Cantu. In 1995, Malo released Señorita on GNP Crescendo Records. The title track of the CD was co-written by Damon Bartlett and Martin Cantu, who, like previous band members, also grew up in the San Francisco Mission District. Martin went on to write the first single, "Take My Breath Away", along with co-writer Damon Bartlett and two other songs, "More Than Friends" and "Malo Ya Llego", co-written with Arcelio Garcia. Martin Cantu also has several songs featured on the 1998 album, Rocks The Rockies, a live Malo concert recording, recorded in Pueblo, Colorado. Since leaving Malo in 1998, Martin Cantu, now an ordained minister who pastors a Christian-based church in the San Francisco Bay Area called Praise Worship Center, continues to tour intensively as a music evangelist as well with his Latin/pop gospel band L-Rey (pronounced “El Rey”). Martin Cantu and L-Rey released a gospel rendition of Malo's "Suavecito" as a hymn titled "Jesucristo". In 1997, Paul Benavidez (1991 Star Seekers Southwest Male Vocalist Champion) joined Malo as co-lead vocalist along with Arcelio Garcia. 
, 

Malo was led since its inception by lead vocalist Arcelio Garcia, until his passing in 2020.  Malo is currently composed of longtime members handpicked by Garcia who have been performing with him for decades to carry on the Malo legacy.  The official licensed Malo Band currently consists of Paul Benavidez (lead vocals), Gibby Ross (timbales), Daniel Cervantes (keyboards/lead vocals), Jay Rosette (guitar/vocals), Pete Rodriguez (trumpet/trombone), Jack Musgrove (trumpet), Brian Beukelman (trumpet), Aaron Wall (drums/vocals), Patrick Olvera (bass/vocals), and Anthony Townsend (congas).

Discography

Albums

Singles

References

External links
Malo's official website

Malo discography at discogs.com

Rock music groups from California
Musical groups from San Francisco
Chicano rock musicians
American Latin musical groups
Warner Records artists